Collège Champittet is a luxury Swiss school in the canton de Vaud operated by Nord Anglia Education, a group of 79 schools around the world. The school offers an academic education for students ages 3–19 and has two campuses: the main one is located in the vicinity of Lausanne in Pully, and the other one in Nyon. The Nyon campus offers Kindergarten and primary school education services, while the Pully campus offers a Kindergarten, primary and a secondary education. The school offers a full boarding service for students who are willing to live in the Pully campus. The school has a 950-student capacity.

The school was established in 1903 by a group of Dominican fathers as a Catholic school for boys. They were in charge of the establishment until 1951, when they passed on the leadership of the school to capitular fathers of the Great Saint-Bernard order, who left the school in the care of a group of professional educators in 1998. During this time, in 1984, the doors of the school became mixed and welcomed girls.

Collège Champittet offers a bilingual program French/English for all students. A bilingual or Francophone curriculum and a program for non-francophone students (French as Foreign Language (FLE)) is also available. For the upper secondary students (age 14 to 19), students can choose between the French Baccalaureate, the FLE program, and the International Baccalaureate Diploma Program. Champittet calls for a technological approach of education. In fact it is accredited by Intersection, an independent company that evaluates the degree and quality of technology integration within the educational environment of private schools at primary and secondary level.

Champittet hosts over 30 different nationalities (50% of which are Swiss), nearly all students are either French native speakers, bilingual or plurilingual (20% are native English speakers).

Many choices of co-curricular and extra-curricular activities are available for students: Global Citizenship, Model UN, Debate Club, music, sports etc. Variety of educational and humanitarian events are possible because of the involvement of Champittet in several charitable projects through Foundation Collège Champittet which collaborates with: Foundation Avotra in Madagascar, Foundation Jan & Oscar in Thailand, Nordstar of Nord Anglia Education in Tanzania and 1001 Fontaines in Cambodia.

Champittet recently absorbed the students from L'Institut Mont-Olivet, a neighbouring school which closed in 2016.

Accreditation
Collège Champittet's (upper) secondary education (Middle and High School) is not approved as a Mittelschule/Collège/Liceo by the Swiss Federal State Secretariat for Education, Research and Innovation (SERI).

Religion 
As the College Champittet has strong Christian roots, it still has some Christian values. Various activities of the chaplaincy are aimed primarily at Catholic children but are open to any children no matter their religion, or because they want to better understand the Christian reality or prepare for baptism. On the occasion of celebrations or liturgical times, several masses are offered to students during the school year. Preparation for the sacraments (Baptism, First Communion and Confirmation) and a choir organization of children and young people are offered by the college's chaplaincy.

Charity 
College Champittet is active the different charity organizations through The Collège Champittet Foundation is non-profit and independent from Nord Anglia Education. The Foundation, which main objectives are to support humanitarian projects mainly in education and to raise awareness among its students about the situation of poorer countries, has its own legal identity and is registered with the official commerce registry.

The Fondation is working in a long term manner in various countries with few foundations:

 In Madagascar, in partnership with Foundation Avotra created by Father Stefano.
 In Thailand, in partnership with Foundation Jan & Oscar.
 In Tanzania, in partnership with Foundation Nordstar of Nord Anglia Education.
 In Cambodia, in partnership with association 1001 Fontaines.

Notable alumni

 Sébastien Barberis : football player
 Marcel Brion: writer and member of the Académie française
 Jean-Marie Lovey : bishop
 Michel Voïta : comedian
 Kevin Scott Allen : American actor
 Bertrand Piccard: Swiss explorer, psychiatrist and environmentalist

References

External links

 Collège Champittet

International schools in Switzerland
Secondary schools in Switzerland
1903 establishments in Switzerland
Educational institutions established in 1903
Buildings and structures in the canton of Vaud
Nyon
Private schools in Switzerland
Boarding schools in Switzerland
International Baccalaureate schools in Switzerland
Nord Anglia Education